The WS21200 is a large transporter erector launcher built and developed in the People's Republic of China. Like the WS51200, the WS21200 is not actually used by the People's Liberation Army Rocket Force, instead, the primary customer is Pakistan. The WS21200 along with the WS51200, is one of the larger TELs developed by the Wanshan Special Vehicle.

The size of the WS21200 allows it to carry ICBMs, however, the technological limitations of Pakistan has forced the WS21200 to mount medium-range ballistic missiles such as the Shaheen-III.

Description

The Wanshan WS21200 is a Chinese/Pakistani 16x16 road-mobile TEL with a payload capacity of 80 tons thanks to the Cummins KTTA19-C700 turbocharged diesel engine. The 700 horsepower engine allows the WS21200 to drive at respectable speeds with a maximum range of 1000 km. Moreover, it grants the WS21200 some cross-country capabilities, further bolstering its mobility and evasiveness.

Similar to its North Korean sister counterpart, the WS51200, the WS21200 is used primarily by the Pakistani Air Force Strategic Command, which aims at improving Islamabad's nuclear first and second strike capabilities. Although it could theoretically mount an ICBM, Pakistan's limited resources in nuclear and ballistic missile technology and capability, means that the full potential for the WS21200 is regulated in carrying the Shaheen-III and Shaheen-II MRBMs.

Operators

Current operators

Pakistan is the sole and current operator of the WS21200.

Former operators

While not an operator, China is the chief manufacturer of the WS21200 TEL.

See also
WS2300
WS2400
WS2500
WS2600
HTF5680A1
WS51200

References

Weapons of Pakistan
Military trucks of China
Military vehicles of the People's Republic of China
Military vehicles of Pakistan